Dana Rotberg is a Mexican film director. She was born in Mexico City in 1960.

Her film Angel of Fire (Angel de fuego) questions whether a feminist quest in Mexico is even possible. The film was screened for the Directors' Fortnight at the 1992 Cannes Film Festival.

Rotberg's first English-language feature film is the 2013 New Zealand release, White Lies.

References

External links
 

1960 births
Feminist filmmakers
Mexican women film directors
Film directors from Mexico City
Living people
Māori-language film directors
English-language film directors
Spanish-language film directors